Annie Pankowski (born November 4, 1994) is an American women's ice hockey player with the PWHPA and the United States women's national ice hockey team. She was the first California born and trained player to make the United States women's national under-18 ice hockey team.

Playing career 

Across 154 NCAA games, Pankowski put up 206 points.  She took leave for the 2017-18 season to train with the American Olympic team. She was a Patty Kazmaier Award finalist three years in a row from 2016 to 2019.

She was drafted 1st overall by the Metropolitan Riveters in the 2018 NWHL Draft, but has yet to make an appearance for the club. In May 2019, she joined the PWHPA, after the collapse of the CWHL. She took part in the 2020 ECHL All-Star Classic and the 2020 NHL All-Star Game.

International 
Pankowski attended North American Hockey Academy and was a member of the United States U18 National Team. In 2013, she was a member of the US national team during their Bring on the World Tour. She logged one point in three games played.

She tried out for the 2014 US Olympic Team, but was a final cut, and was again cut from the American roster a few weeks before the 2018 Winter Olympics, despite assurances that the roster had been set.

Pankowski was one of six Badgers named to the United States roster competing at the 2015 IIHF Women's World Championship in Malmö, Sweden. She also competed in the 2016 and 2019 IIHF World Championships. She won gold with the US at the 2018 4 Nations Cup.

Personal life 
With Badgers teammate Lauren Williams, the two volunteered with Occupaws, an organization that trains guide dogs for the visually impaired in Wisconsin and bordering states. She is currently a student in the Doctor of Veterinary Medicine program at University of Wisconsin-Madison School of Veterinary Medicine.

Her sister, Ali Pankowski, competes for the Princeton Tigers women's ice hockey program. Both her parents are veterinarians.

Awards and honours 
2019 NCAA All-Tournament Team
Hockey Humanitarian Award finalist, 2019
Patty Kazmaier Award top-3 finalist, 2019
2016-17 AHCA-CCM Women's University Division I Second Team All-American 
2015 ALL-WCHA Second Team
2015 Women's Hockey Commissioners Association National Rookie of the Year
2015 WCHA All-Rookie Team
WCHA Rookie of the Week (October 1, 2014)
WCHA Rookie of the Week (Week of November 18, 2014) 
WCHA Rookie of the Week (November 27, 2014)
WCHA Rookie of the Week (January 27, 2015)

External links
 
Wisconsin bio

References

1994 births
Living people
American women's ice hockey forwards
Ice hockey players from California
People from Laguna Hills, California
Wisconsin Badgers women's ice hockey players
Professional Women's Hockey Players Association players